Bosnia and Herzegovina competed at the 2022 World Aquatics Championships in Budapest, Hungary from 18 June to 3 July.

Swimming

Swimmers from Bosnia and Herzegovina have achieved qualifying standards in the following events.

References

Nations at the 2022 World Aquatics Championships
Bosnia and Herzegovina at the World Aquatics Championships
2022 in Bosnia and Herzegovina sport